Pyrausta asopialis is a moth in the family Crambidae. It is found in Colombia and Central America.

References

Moths described in 1875
asopialis
Moths of Central America
Moths of South America